Manuel Joseph (22 May 1965 – October 2021) was a French writer.

Works
Heroes are heroes are (1994)
Edenadale (1994)
La Gueule de l'emploi (1999)
Ça m'a même pas fait mal (2001)
Amilka aime Pessoa (2002)
De la sculpture considérée comme une tauromachie (2003)
Le Bleu du ciel dans la peau (2009)
La Sécurité des personnes et des biens (2010)
La Tête au carré (2010)
Exhibiting Poetry Today: Manuel Joseph, catalogue de l’exposition de Thomas Hirschhorn (2010)
Les Baisetioles (2020)

References

1965 births
2021 deaths
People from Aubervilliers
French writers